Andre Ulrich Zanga (born 4 April 1997) is a Cameroonian footballer who currently plays for Tonnerre Yaoundé.

Career
After spending time in the Kadji Sports Academy Zanga signed on loan with LA Galaxy II, a USL affiliate club of LA Galaxy.

References

External links
Galaxy bio

1997 births
Living people
Cameroonian footballers
Cameroonian expatriate footballers
LA Galaxy II players
Association football midfielders
USL Championship players
Cameroonian expatriate sportspeople in the United States
Expatriate soccer players in the United States
Kadji Sports Academy players
Footballers from Yaoundé
Tonnerre Yaoundé players
Cameroon youth international footballers
Cameroon under-20 international footballers